Love Among the Ruins is a 1975 American made-for-television romantic comedy film directed by George Cukor and starring Katharine Hepburn and Laurence Olivier which premiered on ABC on March 6, 1975.

Plot
The story is set in 1911, at the end of the Edwardian period. Jessica Medlicott is an aging grande dame, formerly an actress of the London theatre, accused of having met, courted, promised marriage to, and then jilted and abandoned her suitor. The much-younger ex-fiancé then files suit, seeking £50,000 in damages for the breach of promise by her. She retains the greatest barrister in the empire, Sir Arthur Granville-Jones, to defend her. He is incidentally also a man she seduced and abandoned 40 years earlier, but who has remained hopelessly in love with her ever since.

Cast

 Katharine Hepburn as Jessica Medlicott
 Laurence Olivier as Sir Arthur Granville-Jones
 Colin Blakely as J. F. Devine
 Richard Pearson as Druce
 Joan Sims as Fanny Pratt
 Leigh Lawson as Alfred Pratt
 Gwen Nelson as Hermione Davis
 Robert Harris as The Judge
 Peter Reeves as Maiden
 John Blythe as Tipstaff
 Arthur Hewlett as The Usher
 John Dunbar as Clerk of the Court
 Iain Sinclair as Pratt's Solicitor
 Mervyn Pascoe as 1st Barrister
 Colin Thomas as 2nd Barrister
 Lincoln Wright as 3rd Barrister
 Edward Arthur as 4th Barrister
 John Bromley as 5th Barrister
 Leslie Southwick as 6th Barrister
 Stanley Platts as Foreman of the Jury
 Philip Lennard as 1st Reporter
 Peter Lund as 2nd Reporter
 Frank Forsyth as Jessop
 John G. Heller as Head Waiter
 Rosamond Burne as 1st Woman Spectator
 Coral Fairweather as 2nd Woman Spectator
 Jacqueline Clarke as Miss Pratt
 T. C. Hogan as Teplow

Awards and nominations

See also
 List of British films of 1975

References

External links

 
 
 

1975 television films
1975 films
1970s romantic comedy-drama films
British romantic comedy-drama films
Emmy Award-winning programs
Peabody Award-winning broadcasts
Films set in the 1910s
Films set in 1911
Films set in England
Films shot in England
Romantic period films
Films directed by George Cukor
Films shot at Pinewood Studios
ABC Motion Pictures films
1970s British films
British comedy-drama television films